Free Lancing is an album by American guitarist James Blood Ulmer recorded in 1981 and released on the Columbia label. It was Ulmer's first of three albums recorded for a major label.

Reception
The Allmusic review by Brian Olewnick awarded the album 4 stars, and states, "it's Ulmer's stinging guitar lines — rough-hewn, corrosive, and scrabbling — throughout this recording that make it one of his finest".  

Trouser Press described both Free Lancing and the subsequent Black Rock as "technical masterpieces, making up in precision what they lack in emotion (as compared to Are You Glad to Be in America?). Working to expand his audience, Ulmer concentrates more on electric guitar flash, and actual melodies can be discerned from the improvised song structures (improvisation being one of the keys to harmolodics)."

Track listing
All compositions by James Blood Ulmer
 "Timeless" - 4:22
 "Pleasure Control" - 5:00
 "Night Lover" - 5:22
 "Where Did All the Girls Come From?" - 4:38      
 "High Time" - 4:00
 "Hijack" - 
 "Free Lancing" - 4:42      
 "Stand Up to Yourself" - 4:37      
 "Rush Hour" - 5:32      
 "Happy Time" - 5:11

Personnel
James Blood Ulmer - electric guitar; vocals (tracks 2, 4 & 8) 
Amin Ali - electric bass
G. Calvin Weston - drums
Ronnie Drayton - second guitar (2, 4 & 8)
Diane Wilson, Irene Datcher, Zenobia Konkerite - background vocals (2, 4 & 8)
David Murray - tenor saxophone (5, 6 & 9)
Oliver Lake – alto saxophone (5, 6 & 9)
Olu Dara - trumpet  (5, 6 & 9)

References

Columbia Records albums
James Blood Ulmer albums
1981 albums